Mansour Hajian (is a former Iranian football player. He played for Iran national football team in 1951 Asian Games.

Club career
He previously played for the Daraei and Shahin and Taj.

Honours
Iran
Asian Games Silver medal: 1951

References

External links

 Mansour Hajian at TeamMelli.com

Iranian footballers
Shahin FC players
Esteghlal F.C. players
Living people
Asian Games silver medalists for Iran
Asian Games medalists in football
Footballers at the 1951 Asian Games
Medalists at the 1951 Asian Games
Association football midfielders
Year of birth missing (living people)
Iran international footballers
20th-century Iranian people